Ken Romain (born 17 April 1993) is a French track and field sprinter who competes in the 100 metres and 200 metres.  He holds personal bests of 10.29 and 20.94 seconds for those events. He was the 100 m gold medallist at the 2014 Mediterranean Athletics U23 Championships. He has competed internationally with the French men's relay teams on several occasions. At the 2014 IAAF World Relays he won a bronze medal in the 4 × 200 metres relay, setting a European record time of 1:20.66 for the event.

Romain also represented his country at the 2017 IAAF World Relays and won age category gold medals in the 4 × 100 metres relay at the 2011 European Athletics Junior Championships and the European Athletics U23 Championships.

International competitions

References

External links

1993 births
Living people
French male sprinters